Vitreorana parvula is a species of small green frog in the family Centrolenidae. It is closely related to Vitreorana uranoscopa. It is endemic to Brazil. Its natural habitats are subtropical or tropical moist lowland forests, rivers, and intermittent freshwater marshes, but it is threatened by habitat loss.

Sources
 
 AmphibiaWeb - Vitreorana parvula

parvula
Endemic fauna of Brazil
Amphibians of Brazil
Taxonomy articles created by Polbot
Amphibians described in 1895